R568 road may refer to:
 R568 road (Ireland)
 R568 (South Africa)